Schwimmer and Schwimer are surnames (German for swimmer) which may refer to:

Entertainment
 Benji Schwimmer (born 1984), American dancer, choreographer and actor, winner of So You Think You Can Dance 
 Buddy Schwimmer (born 1950), swing dancer, father of Benji and Lacey 
 David Schwimmer (born 1966), American actor, best known for the TV series Friends
 Lacey Schwimmer (born 1988), American dancer and singer, US Open Swing Champion, US National Latin Champion
 Rusty Schwimmer (born 1962), American actress

Other
 Al Schwimmer (1917–2011), Israeli businessman
 David Schwimmer (banker) (born 1968/69), American CEO of the London Stock Exchange Group
 Michael Schwimer (born 1986), American baseball player
 Rosika Schwimmer (1877–1948), Hungarian-Jewish pacifist, feminist, and world federalist
 Walter Schwimmer (born 1942), Austrian diplomat

See also
United States v. Schwimmer, a 1929 U.S. Supreme Court case dealing with Rosika Schwimmer's naturalization
Volkswagen Schwimmwagen, nicknamed "Schwimmer"
Schwimmer Airfield, Papua New Guinea